Kamil Švrdlík (born November 25, 1986) is a Czech basketball player for BK Pardubice and the Czech national team.

He participated at the EuroBasket 2017.

References

1986 births
Living people
Centers (basketball)
Czech expatriate basketball people in Spain
Czech expatriate basketball people in Turkey
Czech men's basketball players
Sportspeople from Přerov
Basketball players at the 2015 European Games
European Games competitors for the Czech Republic